Supergroove is a New Zealand funk rock music group. Their debut album Traction was released in 1994. The group disbanded in 1997 but reformed in 2007.

History 
The band was founded on New Year's Eve 1989/1990, having previously been named the Low-Down Dirty Blues Band.

Supergroove's first release was the single Here Comes the Supergroove, which wasn't added to either of their original albums. Supergroove released two albums of original content – Traction, from which four singles were taken, and Backspacer, which yielded two singles. Between the two they recorded the EP Tractor, and put out an EP of remixes, GreatMixes.

Prior to Supergroove's second album Backspacer, singer Che Fu and trumpeter Tim Stewart were fired from the band. The band then entirely split up in 1997 over creative differences. Seven years after the group split a 'Best Of' compilation, Postage, was released.

Performance
 In 1990 Supergroove were the support act for New Kids on the Block at Mount Smart Stadium.
 Saturday, 15 January 1994, Supergroove played at Mountain Rock III, Mountain Rock Music Festival.

Solo careers 
Notable former members include Che Ness, aka Che Fu, now with a successful solo career, Paul Russell,  who still studio drums with Che Fu. Two other ex-members, Tim Stewart (trumpet) and Ben Sciascia (guitar) formed a new band in late 2005 called Svelte with Tim on Lead vocals and Bass. Ian Jones joined upcoming Sydney band Lost Valentinos on drums.

Reunion
Despite what was widely considered to be a less than amicable break up, Supergroove supported Crowded House for the three shows of their October 2007 New Zealand tour. This reunion included Che Fu, Jo Lonie, Tim Stewart, Ben Sciascia, Ian Jones, Nick Atkinson and Karl Steven.

Supergroove continued in 2007 on a summer tour, playing alongside popular New Zealand bands such as Atlas, Elemeno P, The Feelers and were one of the headline Kiwi acts of the Big Day Out 2008 in Auckland. The band featured in the University of Otago's, the University of Canterbury's and the University of Waikato's 2008 orientation weeks.

Supergroove played at the Groove in the Park 2010 festival held on New Zealand's Waitangi Day (6 February), at the Western Springs in Auckland. Supergroove also played at the Homegrown Festival in Wellington on 14 March 2009.

In February 2015, Supergroove reunited to play in all shows of The Winery Tour – 12 shows at various vineyards around New Zealand. http://thewinerytour.co.nz

Members
Current members
 Che Ness – vocals 
 Karl Steven – vocals, keyboards, harmonica 
 Ben Sciascia – guitar 
 Joe Lonie – bass 
 Tim Stewart – trumpet 
 Nick Atkinson – saxophone , keyboards 
 Ian Jones – drums 

Former members
 Paul Russell – drums

Timeline

Discography

Albums

EPs

Singles

Awards

New Zealand Music Awards 

! Ref
|-
| align="center" | 1994
| Malcolm Welsford – "You Gotta Know"
| Best Engineer
| 
| align="center" | 
|-
| align="center" rowspan="6" | 1995
| Traction
| Album of the Year
| 
| align="center" rowspan="6" | 
|-
| "Can't Get Enough"
| Single of the Year
| 
|-
| Supergroove
| Best Group
| 
|-
| Jo Fischer and Matt Noonan – "Can't Get Enough"
| Best Video
| 
|-
| Karl Steven & Malcolm Welsford – Traction
| Best Producer
| 
|-
| Malcolm Welsford – Traction
| Best Engineer
| 
|-
| align="center" rowspan="2" | 1996
| Supergroove
| International Achievement
| 
| rowspan="2" align="center" | 
|-
| Sigi Spath and Jo Fisher – "You Gotta Know"
| Best Video
| 
|-
| rowspan="3" align="center" | 1997
| Sigi Spath and Joe Lonie – "If I Had My Way"
| Best Video
| 
| align="center" rowspan="3" | 
|-
| Malcolm Welsford and Karl Steven – Backspacer
| Best Producer
| 
|-
| Malcolm Welsford – Backspacer
| Best Engineer
| 
|-
| align="center" | 2014
| Supergroove
| Legacy Award
| 
| align="center" | 
|}

References

External links 
AudioCulture profile
Supergroove profile at Muzic.net.nz

APRA Award winners
New Zealand funk musical groups
Funk rock musical groups
Musical groups from Auckland